The Pointe Burnaby is a minor summit north-east of Bishorn. Because of its small prominence it was included in the enlarged list of alpine four-thousanders.

External links 
 List of Alpine four-thousanders

Alpine four-thousanders
Mountains of the Alps
Mountains of Valais
Pennine Alps
Mountains of Switzerland